The 1988–89 season was the 97th season in Liverpool F.C.'s existence, and was their 27th consecutive year in the First Division, and covers the period from 20 August 1988 to 26 May 1989.

The season was overshadowed by the Hillsborough disaster on 15 April 1989. 94 of the club's fans died that day in a crush on the terraces in the semi-final of the FA Cup; a 95th fan died three days later and the death toll eventually reached 96 nearly four years later when another fan died having never regained consciousness.

Liverpool won the rescheduled FA Cup semi-final and went on to win the trophy by beating Everton 3–2 in the final, but were then denied the double for the second season running in even more dramatic fashion than the previous season, when a last minute Arsenal goal gave the visitors a 2–0 win at Anfield and sent the league title to Highbury on goals scored. They had spent much of the season on the fringes of the title race, frequently led by Arsenal and underdogs including Norwich City, Coventry City and newly promoted Millwall, but a late surge in form had seen them cruise back to the top of the league by the time of the penultimate league game.

Squad

Goalkeepers

  Bruce Grobbelaar
  Mike Hooper

Defenders

  Gary Ablett
  Jim Beglin
  David Burrows
  Gary Gillespie
  Alan Hansen
  Steve Nicol
  Steve Staunton
  Nick Tanner
  Barry Venison
  Alex Watson

Midfielders

  John Barnes
  Charlie Boyd
  Kenny Dalglish
  Ray Houghton
  Steve McMahon
  Jim Magilton
  Mike Marsh
  Jan Mølby
  Nigel Spackman
  Ronnie Whelan

Attackers

  John Aldridge
  Peter Beardsley
  John Durnin
  Ian Rush

Transfers

In

Out

Diary of the season

August
After an unhappy season in Italy with Juventus, Ian Rush returned to Anfield on 18 August in a £2.8million deal - a record fee paid by a British club, and the third time in three weeks the national record had been broken. However, the Reds were not alone in signing a top striker to prepare for a title challenge - their close neighbours Everton had paid the previous national record of £2.1million a few days earlier for West Ham United striker Tony Cottee. The challenge from a resurgent Manchester United was likely to be stronger as well following their £1.8million recapture of Mark Hughes.

The season began on 20 August with a 2–1 win over Wimbledon, who had shocked them with a 1–0 win in the FA Cup final the previous May, in the FA Charity Shield. John Aldridge scored both of Liverpool's goals, and rather than relegate Aldridge to the bench on Rush's return, manager Kenny Dalglish altered the 4-4-2 formation to 4-3-3 in order for Rush, Aldridge and Beardsley to feature alongside each other in what was undoubtedly the finest attacking line-up in English football, complemented by wingers John Barnes and Ray Houghton.

Aldridge was on target again on the opening day of the season (27 August) as Liverpool triumphed 3–0 over Charlton Athletic at Selhurst Park and Aldridge grabbed all three goals.

September
September was a slightly disappointing month for the Reds, who began it well with a 1–0 home win over Manchester United at Anfield and finished it with an impressive 3–1 win at Southampton, but in between they were held to 1-1 draws by Aston Villa at Villa Park and Tottenham Hotspur at Anfield. After five league games, they were second in the league behind Norwich City.

As September ended, the Football League Cup quest began for Liverpool in the second round with a 1–0 home win over Walsall.

October
October brought more frustration for a Liverpool side who lost 2–1 at home to struggling Newcastle United at the beginning of the month, and were also beaten by Luton Town and Nottingham Forest before the month was out. On the positive side, they did manage a league win - 2–0 away to West Ham United at the end of the month - and also managed to eliminate Walsall in the League Cup. However, they had slipped to fourth in the First Division which was still being led by Norwich City, who had an eight-point lead over Liverpool and a six-point lead over second placed Arsenal. Millwall, in their first season in the top flight, were springing many surprises as they occupied third place, while regular contenders Nottingham Forest completed the top five. However, the much anticipated title challenge from Manchester United and Everton was not yet transpiring, as both clubs were in the bottom half of the table.

Midfielder Jan Mølby was jailed for three months on a drink-driving charge on 17 October.

November
November was another month of underachievement for Liverpool, who were unbeaten in four games but only managed to win two of them, and ended the month still only fourth in the league, though they had managed to cut the gap between themselves and leaders Norwich City to six points. Arsenal and Millwall were still second and third respectively. After managing to eliminate Arsenal in the League Cup third round, Liverpool's quest for the trophy ended in the fourth round when they were thrashed 4-1 by relegation threatened West Ham United at Upton Park.

December
December brought yet more frustration for the Reds, who managed a 1–0 win at Derby County on Boxing Day, but could only manage 1–1 draws with Everton and Arsenal, and suffered a 1–0 home defeat to Norwich City. However, they were now standing third in the league, with new leaders Arsenal six points ahead of Liverpool and a point ahead of second placed Norwich City. Millwall's surprise challenge was continuing as they ended 1988 in fourth place, while Everton's resurgence had taken them to fifth place.

On a more positive note, Jan Molby was available for selection again at the beginning of the month after serving half of his prison sentence for drink-driving.

January
1989 began on a disappointing note for Liverpool, who were beaten 3-1 by Manchester United on New Year's Day at Old Trafford in a game dominated by 19-year-old United midfielder Russell Beardsmore. This left Liverpool fifth in the table and just one point and one place ahead of Alex Ferguson's improving side. They were now nine points behind leaders Arsenal and second placed Norwich City, and two points behind Millwall and Everton.

The FA Cup quest began at Brunton Park on 7 January, when Liverpool eliminated Fourth Division Carlisle United 3–0. Three weeks later they met Millwall in the fourth round at The Den and won 2–0, but their dreams of a unique second double were still looking doubtful as a less than brilliant month, including a 2-2 draw away at relegation threatened Sheffield Wednesday after being 2-0 down, meant they were still fourth in the league and nine points adrift of leaders Arsenal, who had a game in hand. Norwich City were still second and Coventry City had now leapfrogged them to occupy third place, though Everton had suffered another setback and now stood ninth.

February
February was a quiet month at Anfield, as bad weather restricted them to just two first team games. The first, at St James' Park in the league, saw them draw 2–2 with struggling Newcastle United and fail to improve on their fifth place standing. The second, however, gave more cause for celebration as Liverpool took on Hull City in the FA Cup fifth round at Boothferry Park and came away as 3-2 winners.

March
March saw what were arguably Liverpool's finest performances of the season yet. They were victors in all six league games, the best game being a 5–0 home win over Luton Town on 14 March, and a 1–0 home win over Derby County on 29 March meant that they ended the month in third place - five points behind leaders Arsenal and with a game in hand. Norwich City were still second, but the Reds were just two points behind them. Millwall and Nottingham Forest completed the top five, while Manchester United and Everton were heading for mid table mediocrity after giving the Reds a serious run for their money earlier in the season.

The FA Cup quarter-final on 18 March saw the Reds take on Third Division underdogs Brentford at Anfield, and any talk of a giant killing feat was quickly silenced as the Reds triumphed 4–0. This gave them a semi-final clash with Nottingham Forest at Hillsborough on 15 April.

April
The events at the FA Cup semi-final at Hillsborough on 15 April overshadowed Liverpool's season - and in general the whole English football season - as it became the worst tragedy to hit English sport and the worst day of Liverpool's history. A crush of Liverpool fans in the Leppings Lane end of the stadium as the game kicked off turned into a scene of carnage as it became apparent that people were being injured, and after six minutes the match was cancelled. It was soon clear that people were dying, while those lucky enough to survive managed to escape by climbing over the security fences (against which many of the dead and injured were crushed) and others managed to haul themselves to safety in the seated area above the behind-goal standing zone. Within a couple of hours, there was talk of more than 30 deaths, and by the evening it was clear that the death toll was well over double that number. 94 fans died that day - 93 at the stadium and a 94th on their way to hospital. The death toll reached 95 on 19 April when 14-year-old Lee Nichol died in hospital from his injuries. A 96th fan - Tony Bland - died in March 1993 after being in a coma for nearly four years. For a while, it looked as though the 1988-89 FA Cup would be cancelled in memory of the victims, but it was soon decided that the competition would continue.

In the league, the Reds managed comfortable wins over Norwich City, Sheffield Wednesday and Millwall to go top of the table above Arsenal on goal difference. However, there was no league action that month after the Hillsborough tragedy.

May
Liverpool's first competitive game after the tragedy at Hillsborough finally came on 3 May, when they drew 0–0 with Everton in the Merseyside derby at Goodison Park. By now, Arsenal had overtaken them and built up a five-point lead with four games remaining, though Liverpool had a game in hand. However, the next four league games were all won by Liverpool and they entered the final game of the season with a three-point lead over Arsenal. Their opponents in the final game of the season were Arsenal at Anfield, and only a win with a margin of two or more goals would see Arsenal prise the league title away from Liverpool. As 90 minutes loomed, Arsenal had a 1–0 lead but if it stayed that way Liverpool would seal the title by a single goal. However, Arsenal midfielder Michael Thomas scored with the last kick of the game and Arsenal sealed the league title by the narrowest possible margin.

Due to the Hillsborough tragedy, the English league season had been extended by two weeks and this meant that several clubs - including Liverpool - played twice after the FA Cup final.

The rescheduled FA Cup semi-final with Nottingham Forest was staged at Old Trafford on 7 May, and Liverpool won 3–1. This booked them their second all-Merseyside final with Everton in four seasons. John Aldridge, Liverpool's leading scorer that season, opened the scoring in the fourth minute, and Everton failed to respond until the 89th minute when Stuart McCall jabbed in a late equaliser to force extra time. Aldridge had come off in the 73rd minute to be replaced by Ian Rush, who restored Liverpool's lead in the 95th minute, only for Stuart McCall to respond with his second goal in the 102nd minute to equaliser once again. However, Rush scored the winner two minutes later, meaning that he had scored twice in both of the all-Merseyside FA Cup finals.

Had Liverpool won the league title as well, they would have become the first team to repeat the double. But as had happened the previous season (when they had won the league title but been pipped to the FA Cup in the final) they were beaten to this unique honour at the final hurdle.

League table

Matches

First Division

FA Cup

Final

League Cup

FA Charity Shield

Mercantile Credit Centenary Trophy

Dubai Champions Cup

References
LFC History.net – Games for the 1988–89 season
Liverweb - Games for the 1988–89 season

Liverpool F.C. seasons
Liverpool